William Harry Larson (born October 7, 1953) is a former American football tight end in the National Football League for the San Francisco 49ers, Detroit Lions, Washington Redskins, Philadelphia Eagles, Denver Broncos, and the Green Bay Packers.  He played college football at Colorado State University.

1953 births
Living people
American football tight ends
San Francisco 49ers players
Detroit Lions players
Washington Redskins players
Philadelphia Eagles players
Denver Broncos players
Green Bay Packers players